London Sovereign is a bus company in North London. It is a subsidiary of RATP Dev Transit London and operates buses under contract to Transport for London.

Company history

London Sovereign can trace its roots back to independent Borehamwood Travel Services which ran a fleet that included ex-Kelvin Central MCW Metrobuses and Northern Counties Palatines bodied Leyland Olympians and a collection of other vehicles. In 1993 it won its biggest London Buses contract, to operate route 13 with leased AEC Routemasters in its orange livery. In August 1994, Borehamwood Travel Services was sold to the Blazefield Group's Sovereign subsidiary, with the two operations merged as Sovereign London. On 3 November 2002, the business was sold to Transdev, and renamed Transdev London Sovereign.

After London United was transferred to RATP Group as a result of the wider Transdev group's merger with Veolia Transport in March 2011, London Sovereign became Transdev's only London bus company. In March 2014, London Sovereign was sold to RATP and resumed trading as London Sovereign. In December 2021, RATP's London bus operations including London Sovereign were transferred to a RATP joint venture with Australia's Kelsian Group (parent company of Tower Transit) known as RATP Dev Transit London.

Garages
London Sovereign operate two bus garages.

Edgware (BT)

As of September 2021, Edgware garage operated routes 79, 125, 226, 251, 288, 326, H12, 642 and N5

History
Edgware garage was first opened by the London General Omnibus Company in 1925 with space for 24 buses, but there was plenty of room adjacent to the Underground station which had recently been built. In 1939 a new building was built next to the original building which was to become the new bus station, while the remaining open parking area was used to store vehicles for the trolleybus replacement program. In 1984 a new 100 bus garage was built on the site of the long closed Edgware railway station at a cost of £4.5 million. In 1992 plans were made to close Edgware garage as Cricklewood garage was to become a fully functioning garage with new facilities. The outdoor parking area and the bus station then became a midibus base in 1993, with a new bus wash and light maintenance facilities provided in the yard.

In 1999, London Sovereign, having won some tenders for bus services in North-West London, took a 10-year lease on half of Edgware garage and invested in a new maintenance facility which was to replace its former base at Borehamwood. In late 2000, Metroline moved back into the other half of the garage, making it one of the few garages to be shared by two operators.  On 25 July 2015 London Sovereign commenced operating route 326. London Sovereign operated route 125 in January 2022 with electric buses being introduced in October. Route 142 passed to Metroline on 7 January 2023 with 226 being operated by London Sovereign at the same time with electric buses coming soon. Route 251 will also pass to Metroline on 2 September 2023 and London Sovereign will operate 340 at the same time using existing hybrid buses.

Harrow (SO)

As of September 2021, Harrow garage operated routes 183, 395, 398, H9, H10, H14, H18, H19 and X140

History
Harrow garage opened in 1994. It is RATP Dev's smallest London garage holding just 42 buses. The low roof beam across the middle of the depot building was raised to allow double deckers. The garage has a plot of land next to it, owned by London Sovereign, which is now used to park most of the single decker's due to the 183 allocation, which started on 24 July 2015. The 183 is split between Harrow and Edgware with the majority of buses at Harrow. Route 183 is now fully allocated to Harrow, with routes 398 & H17 transferred to Park Royal (RP) to make room. As of 7 September 2019, route H13 has moved to Uxbridge garage, which is owned by Metroline. In 2020, H9 and H10 was transferred from Parr Road to here and London Sovereign started operating routes 398 and H17. In December 2021, RATP Dev started operating their first electric buses on the garages for routes H9 and H10. They were later introduced into routes 183, 398 and X140.

Parr Road (CP)
As of March 2021, Parr Road garage operated routes 125, 288, 303, H11, 698 and X140

History

Former Garages

North Wembley (NW)

North Wembley garage operated routes H9 and H10.

History

On 26 January 2019, part of the allocations of routes H9 and H10 were temporarily transferred from Harrow (SO) garage to this garage.

On 5 September 2020, North Wembley (NW) was announced closed. Routes H9 and H10 was transferred to Parr Road (CP) garage at the same time.

Fleet
As at May 2015, the fleet consisted of 152 buses.

References

External links

London bus operators
RATP Group